William Lee Scott (born July 6, 1973) is an American actor. He is best known for his role as high school student Stanley "Bullethead" Kuznocki on the WB sitcom The Steve Harvey Show. Additionally, he appeared in the films Gone in 60 Seconds, Pearl Harbor, October Sky and The Butterfly Effect.

Career
Scott began his career as a series regular on The Steve Harvey Show, with guest roles in other TV shows such as Fitz and Gun. His first feature film role came as the younger version of Loren Dean's character in Andrew Nicolas' Gattaca. He can also be seen as Hank in the TV movie Before Women Had Wings and as Randy in the independent picture The Opposite of Sex. In 1999, Scott starred in October Sky as Roy Lee Cooke. He also had a role in the 2000 film Gone in 60 Seconds. In 2007, he guest starred in Criminal Minds in the episode "Children of the Dark." In January 2016, he reunited with his co-star Steve Harvey for his birthday show on his self-titled talk show during the segment of "Ask Steve". In 2021, Scott reunited with his former Steve Harvey show co-star Cedric the Entertainer on CBS' The Neighborhood on the season 3 episode "Welcome to the Dad Band".

Filmography

Film

Television

References

External links
 

Living people
Place of birth missing (living people)
American male film actors
American male television actors
Waldorf school alumni
1973 births